William A. Massey (1856–1914) was a U.S. Senator from Nevada from 1912 to 1913.

Senator Massey may also refer to:

A. Shane Massey (born 1975), South Carolina State Senate
Becky Duncan Massey (born 1955), Tennessee State Senate
Chris Massey (politician) (born 1971), Mississippi State Senate
Zachary D. Massey (1864–1923), Tennessee State Senate

See also
Senator Massie (disambiguation)
Senator Mazzei (disambiguation)